Tonkin refers to:

Vietnam

Đông Kinh, a former name of Hanoi, Vietnam
Tonkin, an exonym for northern Vietnam
the French protectorate of Tonkin, the northern part of French Indochina
Gulf of Tonkin, a gulf in the South China Sea
Gulf of Tonkin incident, a 1964 naval incident that precipitated the Gulf of Tonkin Resolution
Gulf of Tonkin Resolution, the 1964 resolution of the US Congress that precipitated the buildup of US forces in Vietnam
In France, the Sino-French War (1884–1885) is termed the Tonkin War.
the Tonkin Affair, a political crisis in France

People

Anthony Tonkin (b. 1980), English footballer
Arthur Tonkin (politician) (b. 1930), Australian politician
Arthur Tonkin (rugby union) (1922–1991), Australian rugby player
David Tonkin (1929–2000), Premier of South Australia
Felicity Tonkin (b. 1985), daughter of Mark Phillips and Heather Tonkin
Humphrey Tonkin (b. 1939), American-British professor and Esperantist
John Tonkin (1902–1995), Premier of Western Australia
Phoebe Tonkin (b. 1989), Australian actress

Other
Tonkin Highway, a major arterial road in Perth, Western Australia
Tonkin Street in Hong Kong
Tonkinese cat, cat breed
A type of Bamboo (Arundinaria amabilis or Pseudosasa amabilis).
Tokyo